Young Women's Christian Association is a historic YWCA building in Richmond, Virginia. It was built in 1913–1914, and is a three-story, five bay, brick and stone Renaissance Revival style building. The two-story rear block contains the gymnasium. The building features an elaborately designed entry portico with a curved exterior staircase.

It was listed on the National Register of Historic Places in 1984.

References

YWCA buildings
Clubhouses on the National Register of Historic Places in Virginia
Renaissance Revival architecture in Virginia
Buildings and structures completed in 1914
Buildings and structures in Richmond, Virginia
National Register of Historic Places in Richmond, Virginia
1914 establishments in Virginia
History of women in Virginia